City High School is a private secondary school in Nairobi, Kenya.

History and operations
City High School was established in 1952 by the Sharma family, who had managed several high schools in the Ngara area.

On October 31, 1964, around 1000 boys at the school went on strike, objecting to the school facilities.

Ram Lal Sharma, who was the school's proprietor in the 1970s, was a follower of Hare Krishna. City High School was one of the last schools founded by her.

Lilian Mumias, wife of Nabongo (King) Peter Mumia II of the Wanga Kingdom, was among the school's teachers in the 1970s.

Notable pupils

 Patrick Obara
 Thomas Odoyo, Kenyan cricketer
 Heronimo Sehmi, actor
 Professor George Wajackoyah

See also

 Education in Kenya
 List of schools in Kenya

References

Organizations with year of disestablishment missing
1952 establishments in Kenya
Defunct high schools
Defunct schools in Kenya
Educational institutions established in 1952
Schools in Nairobi
High schools and secondary schools in Kenya
Private schools in Kenya